Cezar Stelzner de Lima (born 14 August 1974) is a Brazilian handball player. He competed in the men's tournament at the 1996 Summer Olympics.

References

External links
 

1974 births
Living people
Brazilian male handball players
Olympic handball players of Brazil
Handball players at the 1996 Summer Olympics
Sportspeople from Santa Catarina (state)